Hoia may refer to:
 Hoia Forest, in Romania
 Hoia (crustacean), a genus of parasitic crustaceans in the family Chondracanthidae

See also
 HolA, a bacterial gene
 Hoja (disambiguation)
 Hoya (disambiguation)